Free will is the ability of agents to make choices unconstrained by certain factors.

Free Will may also refer to:
 Free Will (Gil Scott-Heron album) (1972)
 Free Will (Freeway album) (2016)
 Free Will (book), a 2012 book by Sam Harris
 Free-Will, a Japanese independent record label
 "Freewill" (song), a 1980 song by Rush

See also
 FreeWill, software company for charitable donations
 Free will in theology
 Free will theorem
 Freedom of choice
 Karma
 Neuroscience of free will
 Theodicy and the Bible#Bible and free will theodicy
 Volition (psychology)
 Will (philosophy)
 Will (sociology)